1975 in philosophy

Events

Publications
 Anderson, Alan Ross and Nuel Belnap. Entailment: the logic of relevance and necessity, vol. I. Princeton University Press.
 Capra, Fritjof. The Tao of Physics: An Exploration of the Parallels Between Modern Physics and Eastern Mysticism.
 Cole, Peter and Jerry L. Morgan (ed.), Syntax and Semantics Vol. 3: Speech Acts. New York: Academic Press.
 Grice, Paul. "Logic and conversation." pp. 41–58. (Reprinted in Studies in the Way of Words, ed. H. P. Grice, pp. 22–40. Cambridge, MA: Harvard University Press, 1989)
 Searle, John. "Indirect speech acts." pp. 59–82. (Reprinted in Pragmatics: A Reader, ed. S. Davis, pp. 265–277. Oxford: Oxford University Press, 1991)
 Gordon, D. and Lakoff, George. "Conversational postulates." pp. 83–106.
 Green, Georgia M. "How to get people to do things with words." pp. 107–141.
 Davison, A. "Indirect speech acts and what to do with them." pp. 143–184.
 Cole, Peter. "The synchronic and diachronic status of conversational implicature." pp. 257–288.
 Douglas, Mary. Implicit Meanings: Essays in Anthropology.
 Feyerabend, Paul. Against Method: Outline of an Anarchistic Theory of Knowledge.
 Fodor, Jerry. The Language of Thought, Harvard University Press.
 Hacking, Ian. Why Does Language Matter to Philosophy?
 Hacking, Ian. The Emergence of Probability: a Philosophical Study of Early Ideas About Probability, Induction and Statistical Inference. Cambridge: Cambridge University Press.
 Lewis, David. "Languages and language." In Minnesota Studies in the Philosophy of Language, ed. K. Gunderson, vol. 7, pp. 3–35. Minneapolis: University of Minnesota Press. Reprinted in A. P. Martinich, ed., The Philosophy of Language 3rd edition, pp. 538–557. New York: Oxford University Press, 1996.
 Pask, Gordon. Conversation, Cognition and Learning. New York: Elsevier.
 Pask, Gordon. The Cybernetics of Human Learning and Performance. Hutchinson.
 Percy, Walker. The Message in the Bottle.
 Putnam, Hilary. Mind, Language and Reality (Philosophical Papers Vol. 2), Cambridge: Cambridge University Press.
 "The Meaning of 'Meaning'"
 Ricoeur, Paul. The Rule of Metaphor: Multi-Disciplinary Studies in the Creation of Meaning in Language, trans. Robert Czerny with Kathleen McLaughlin and S. J., John Costello, London: Routledge and Kegan Paul, 1978.
 Singer, Peter. Animal Liberation.
 Sober, Elliott. Simplicity. Oxford University Press.
 Sperber, Dan. Rethinking Symbolism. Cambridge University Press.
 Unger, Peter. Ignorance: A Case for Skepticism. New York: Oxford University Press.
 Unger, Roberto. Knowledge and Politics. Free Press.
 Michael Polanyi and Harry Prosch, Meaning.
 Hans Blumenberg, The Genesis of the Copernican World.

Births
 9 November - Raphaël Enthoven

Deaths
 4 December - Hannah Arendt, 69

Philosophy
20th-century philosophy
Philosophy by year